Frank Sidney Follwell (6 May 1906 – 3 December 1992) was a Liberal party member of the House of Commons of Canada, merchant and realtor. He was born in London, England. He was the mayor of Belleville, Ontario from 1945 to 1947.

He was first elected to Parliament at the Hastings South riding in the 1949 general election then re-elected in 1953. Follwell was defeated by Lee Grills of the Progressive Conservative party in the 1957 election.

References

External links
 

1906 births
1992 deaths
British expatriates in Canada
Canadian merchants
Liberal Party of Canada MPs
Members of the House of Commons of Canada from Ontario
Politicians from London
Mayors of Belleville, Ontario